Vivian Inés Urdaneta Rincón (born June 8, 1979, in Maracaibo) is a Venezuelan journalist and beauty queen who captured the crown of Miss International 2000.

Miss Venezuela International
Urdaneta, who stands , competed as Miss Costa Oriental in her country's national pageant, Miss Venezuela, and obtained the title of Miss Venezuela International.

Miss International
As the official representative of her country to the 2000 Miss International pageant held in Tokyo, Japan on October 14, 2000, she competed against 57 other delegates for the crown and won the title of Miss International 2000.

References

External links
Official Miss International website - Past titleholders

Miss Venezuela International winners
Miss International winners
Living people
People from Maracaibo
1979 births
Miss International 2000 delegates
Venezuelan beauty pageant winners